Dame Sarah Valerie Falk,  (born 1 June 1962) is a British Court of Appeal judge. She was previously a High Court judge and senior Judicial Appointments Commissioner.

Career 
Falk studied law at Sidney Sussex College, Cambridge, and was admitted as a solicitor in 1986. Specialising in corporate tax she became a partner in Freshfields in 1994, notably working on the corporate restructure of EMI in 2011.

During her career at Freshfields, Falk noted she experienced sexism despite being a partner. In an interview, she said during her time there she would often be the only female attending meetings and male her colleagues in those meetings would demonstrate selective hearing, with a male colleague repeating a point she had made earlier which then would be treated as a good idea.

In 2015 she was appointed as a deputy judge of the Upper Tribunal (Tax and Chancery Chamber) having left Freshfields partnership while still working on a consultancy basis until 2018.

High Court appointment 
On 1 October 2018 she was appointed as a High Court judge. She received the customary Damehood in 2019.

On 1 October 2019, she was appointed as a Judicial Commissioner of the Judicial Appointments Commission. She retired from the post on 30 September 2022.

Court of Appeal and Privy Council appointment 
Her appointment to the Court of Appeal was announced on 2 November 2022. On 14 December 2022 Falk was appointed to the Privy Council, entitling her to the style The Right Honourable for life.

Personal life 
Falk married Marcus Flint in 1985, she has one son and one daughter. She has an interest in classical music, dog walking and horse riding.

She acted as chair of the ProCorda Trust, a youth music organisation, between 2008 and 2018.

References 

Chancery Division judges
Alumni of Sidney Sussex College, Cambridge
1962 births
Living people
Dames Commander of the Order of the British Empire
21st-century English judges
English women judges
21st-century women judges
British lawyers
Members of the Privy Council of the United Kingdom